WBLJ 1230 kHz) is an AM radio station broadcasting a news talk information format. Licensed to Dalton, Georgia, United States, the station serves the Chattanooga metropolitan area.  The station is currently owned by North Georgia Radio Group, L.P. and features programming from Fox News Radio, Fox Sports Radio, Premiere Networks, and Radio America.

References

External links
WBLJ 1230 official website

BLJ
Radio stations established in 1986
1986 establishments in Georgia (U.S. state)